Karasburg (old name , literally "carst spring") is a town of 4,000 inhabitants in the ǁKaras Region of southern Namibia and the district capital of the Karasburg electoral constituency. It lies at the heart of the southern Namibian sheep farming industry.

Location 
There are three main routes that lead into Karasburg. From Grünau in the west, Onseepkans in the south and the B3 national road that leads to the South African border in the east. Karasburg is the only relatively large town south of Keetmanshoop in Namibia.

Economy 
Karasburg's main industry is sheep farming, but it is also an important truck stop for transport vehicles streaming into Namibia from the South African border. The town supports several massive farms in the area. The town also has its own airstrip which is used mainly for light aircraft or as an emergency landing strip for larger planes. Karasburg Railway Station was once the busiest train station in Southern Namibia and is also the last significant stop before Upington.

Karasburg was downgraded from municipality to town status in 2010. The town is riddled with unemployment as there is no industry, and the little rainfall hampers commercial farming.

Climate 
Karasburg has an extreme climate most times of the year with summer temperatures rising well over 40 degrees Celsius and dropping to sub-zero in winter. Low rainfall is seen in this region (annual average rainfall:  at the Karasburg weather station), but the rains usually come in early January and leave as late as early April, depending on the previous season's nature.

Politics
Karasburg is governed by a town council that has seven seats.

In the 2010 local authority election in Karasburg, a total of 808 votes were recorded. SWAPO won with approximately 46% of the vote. Of the three other parties seeking votes in the election, Rally for Democracy and Progress (Namibia) (RDP) received approximately 33% of the vote, followed by the Democratic Party of Namibia (DPN, 14%) and the Democratic Turnhalle Alliance (DTA, 6%). The resulting local council including three SWAPO members, three RDP members and one DPN member. The DPN's Caroline Arendse was elected mayor as the result of an alliance with SWAPO on 3 December 2010. However, the national Democratic Party condemned the alliance and called the swearing-in ceremony fraudulent. On 8 December, Arendse was recalled from her position in the council and replaced with Ernest Willem Anderson.

The 2015 local authority election was also won by SWAPO which gained five seats (586 votes). The remaining two seats went to the DTA with 204 votes. In the 2020 local authority election the Landless People's Movement (LPM, a new party registered in 2018) won with 572 votes and gained four seats. SWAPO was the runner-up with 294 votes and two sets. The remaining council seat went to the Independent Patriots for Change (IPC, an opposition party formed in August 2020) with 241 votes.

Wildlife 
The Karasburg region hosts a variety of large to small game, ranging from Kudu and Springbok to Duiker, Klipspringer, Steenbok, Jackal and Caracal. The Kudu are abundant among the 'koppies' and roam free, leaping over any fence that may come in their way whereas the Springbok on the other hand are bound to single encampments, because they lack the suppleness and length to jump over fences. Caracals are widely hunted down by farmers, because they prey on the lambs of sheep. Gemsbuck are also widely scattered across the region in addition to Zebra and Red Hartebeest.

People from Karasburg
 John Walters (born 1956), Namibian ombudsman 2004–2021
 Ida Hoffmann (born 1947), politician

References 

 

Towns in Namibia
Populated places in the ǁKaras Region